Urozana is a genus of moths in the subfamily Arctiinae.

Species
 Urozana cordatula Druce, 1885
 Urozana metaphaenica Dognin, 1916

References

Natural History Museum Lepidoptera generic names catalog

Lithosiini
Moth genera